Shwebo is a city in Sagaing Region, Burma, 110 km north-west of Mandalay between the Irrawaddy and the Mu rivers. The city was the origin of the Konbaung Dynasty, established by King Alaungpaya in 1752, that was the dominant political force in Burma after the mid-18th century. It served as Alaungpaya's capital from 1752 to 1760. As of 2021, it has a population of 88,914.

History

Up to 1752, Shwebo was a village, called Moksobo of about 300 houses. It lies near the site of the ancient Pyu city-state of Hanlin. On 29 February 1752, the chief of the village Aung Zeya founded the Konbaung Dynasty to resist the upcoming invasion of Lower Burma-based Hanthawaddy forces. Aung Zeya, who also assumed the royal title of Alaungpaya, gained the allegiance of 46 surrounding villages, and organized defenses building a stockade and digging a moat around Moksobo. He renamed his village, Shwebo. Over the next eight years, Alaungpaya led the reunification of Burma with Shwebo as his capital.

Shwebo lost its status as capital after Alaungpaya's death in 1760. The successor Naungdawgyi moved the capital to Sagaing closer to the Irrawaddy river. 
Nonetheless, Shwebo  continued to be an important region throughout the Konbaung era (1752–1885), providing a disproportionate share of soldiers that served in Konbaung's armies. The region was usually held as an appanage by the most senior princes, usually the crown prince. 
It was to Shwebo that Prince of Mindon went in 1853 to raise the standard of rebellion in his successful bid to overthrow his half brother Pagan.

Names of Shwebo

Shwebo is famous for its five names. Five titles had been conferred to the city namely:
 Moksobo, its original name
 Yadana-Theinhka
 Konbaung
 Yangyi-Aung, and
 Shwebo, its modern name.
Most of the people knows above names but the name "အယုစြ်ဇပူရ" and "မြေဘုံသာ" ("Ayuhcyajpuur" and "Myaybhonesar") are rarely known.

Geography

Climate
Located in the “Dry Valley” in the rain shadow of the Arakan Mountains, Shwebo lies on the boundary between a tropical savanna climate (Köppen Aw) and a hot semi-arid climate (BSh). The city received  of rainfall on 19 October 2011. It was the record breaking rainfall within 24 hours of October for past 48 years.

Transport

Shwebo is served by Myanmar Railways's Mandalay-Myitkyina railway line. The city is best reached by pickup truck or bus as the roads from Mandalay and Monywa are in reasonably good shape. 
There are highway express buses from Yangon to Shwebo.
Shwebo also lies on Mandalay-Myitkyina Union Express Road.

Economy
As with Monywa, the city is a trade center for agricultural produce, especially beans, rice and sesame from the surrounding plains between the Mu River and the Ayeyarwady River.

The major tourist attractions in Shwebo, although few tourists make the journey and facilities are very limited, are its numerous Buddhist temples, and the reconstruction of Alaungpaya's palace. The city is still surrounded by its ancient moat. There are many pagodas, such as Shwetaza Buddha Image and Myodaung Pagoda.

Moreover, tourists can visit Hanlin, the ground of ancient Pyu City. Hanlin is one hour drive from Shwebo. It is one of UNESCO World Cultural Heritage Sites.

In the very hot summer, people who live in Shwebo believe that rain comes when people bring the Shwetaza Buddha Image around the town.

Education
There are five Basic Education High Schools in Shwebo. 
The town is home to the Shwebo University and Shwebo Government Technological College. 
Government Technological College (Shwebo) was established on 20 January 2007.

Famous places

At the time of building the Shwebo City, the King Alaungpaya built seven places; 
The Shwechattho Pagoda built in the place where the King Alaungpaya was born
The city
The Mahananda Lake
The auspicious ground
The central drum (Bahosidaw)
The place for nine city guardian spirits
Shwebo Palace (Shwebonyadana Mingala Nandaw)
Myodaung Pagoda
Tomb of Alaungphaya
Shwetaza Buddha Image
The auspicious  ground (Maha Aung Myay)

Some Famous Villages in ShweBo Region.

Of the many villages south of Shwebo (next to the Shwebo-Mandalay highway), there are two villages called Zee Taw-Taganan.

 Of these villages, Taganan Village (now Taganan Model Village) is the closest to Shwebo.  It is a rice-rich village with a large number of graduates. The village is circular in shape and is located in the southern and northern parts of the village.  The pagoda festival(Myat Saw Mon Pagoda was built by King MaNiSiThu also called AlaungSiThu ) is celebrated every year on the 3rd day of Tan Zaung Mon (တန်ဆောင်မုန်း).  The northern part of the village is home to a large number of well-educated, civil servant - paddy fields and land owners.

 The other village is Zee Taw village, which belongs to the whole of Shwebo.  It is a place of worship for the gods and goddesses of Zee Taw village, known as Fe Gyi May Gyi, who takes care of the whole Shwebo area, offering unforgettable offerings, including harvest time for everything from births, weddings, new homes, new cars to new items.

See also
2012 Shwebo earthquake
Basic Education High School No. 3 Shwebo
Shwebo University

References

External links
'Famous pagoda festival in Shwebo 
 "Shwebo, Burma", Falling Rain Genomics, Inc.
 "Shwebo Map — Satellite Images of Shwebo", Maplandia
  Myanmar:  the Missing Link from Western China to India’s N.E. States Transit routes from western China through northern Myanmar.  Oilseedcrops.org; Editor Article.
 A community website about Shwebo

Township capitals of Myanmar
Populated places in Sagaing Region
Shwebo District